David Jeffrey Meltzer (born 1955) is an American archaeologist known for his influential studies of Paleoindians and Pleistocene mammalian extinction. According to the American Academy of Arts and Sciences, his research on Paleoindians' "varied adaptive strategies has forced a revision of the received wisdom that Pleistocene people were exclusively big-game hunters or were responsible for Pleistocene mammalian extinction."

Meltzer is currently Henderson-Morrison Professor of Prehistory in the Department of Anthropology and Executive Director of the Quest Archaeological Research Program at Southern Methodist University. He is also a Fellow of the American Association for the Advancement of Science and American Academy of Arts and Sciences, and a member of the National Academy of Sciences and the Academy of Medicine, Engineering and Science of Texas.

Personal life and education 
Meltzer first encountered archaeology at the age of 15, when he participated in the excavation of the Thunderbird Site, an important Paleoindian Clovis site near Front Royal, Virginia. He went on to receive his Bachelor of Arts in Anthropology from the University of Maryland and Master of Arts and PhD in Anthropology from the University of Washington. At Washington, he studied with Robert Dunnell, a noted evolutionary archaeologist of eastern North America. Prior to graduating, Meltzer was also a Predoctoral Fellow at the Smithsonian Institution.

Career 
Upon graduating from the University of Washington in 1984, Meltzer accepted a position in the Department of Anthropology at Southern Methodist University.

Works 

 Folsom: New archaeological investigations of a classic Paleoindian bison kill (2006)
 The Great Paleolithic War: How Science Forged an Understanding of America's Ice Age Past (2015)
 The Mountaineer site: a Folsom winter camp in the Rockies (2021, with B.N. Andrews and M. Stiger)
 First peoples in a new world: Populating Ice Age America (2021)

References 

University System of Maryland alumni
University of Washington alumni
Southern Methodist University faculty
American archaeologists
Fellows of the American Academy of Arts and Sciences
1955 births
Living people